Dhairyasheel Sambhajirao Mane (b 1981) is an Indian politician. He is elected to the Lok Sabha, lower house of the Parliament of India from Hatkanangale, Maharashtra in the 2019 Indian general election as member of the Shiv Sena.

He received total 5,85,776 votes in the 2019 Indian general election.

His grandfather Rajaram Mane was member of loksabha continuously for 5 terms (1977 to 1991). He represented Ichalkaranji constituency and was member of Indian National Congress party. Dhairyshil's mother Nivedita Mane was also MP of Loksabha for two terms 1999 and 2004, representing Ichalkaranji constituency for Nationalist Congress Party.

Positions held 
 2002 : Elected as member of Rukadi Gram Panchayat
 2007 : Elected as member of Kolhapur Zilha Parishad
 2009 : Elected as Deputy president of Kolhapur Zilha Parishad
 2012 : Re-Elected as member of Kolhapur Zilha Parishad
 2012 : Elected as opposition leader of Kolhapur Zilha Parishad 
 2019 : Elected to 17th Lok Sabha, from Hatkanangale

References

External links
Official biographical sketch in Parliament of India website

India MPs 2019–present
Lok Sabha members from Maharashtra
Living people
Shiv Sena politicians
People from Kolhapur district
1981 births